Squat Theatre (1977–1991) was a Hungarian theatre company from Budapest which left Hungary for Paris and then New York City, where they performed experimental theatre.

History
Living in Paris in 1977, a friend of the company, Tamas Szentjoby, suggested that they change the name from Kassák Haz Studió to Squat Theatre. The first play was created for a Western audience: Pig, Child, Fire!  It was set in a storefront in Rotterdam, a setting that became their trademark. After touring Nancy, France, Shiraz, Baltimore, Paris, the company arrived at the Hotel Chelsea in July, they settled in New York City. Several members left the company in 1985 when they lost the lease to their space on 23rd Street including Anna Koós, Péter Halász, Eric Daille, and Agnes Santha.  The rest of the company continued until 1991, Squat Theatre's last play was Full Moon Killer, 1991, performed at The Kitchen in New York City.

Founding members
The six founding members of Squat Theatre (shown left to right in the 1976 Paris photograph) are Peter (Breznyik) Berg, Marianne Kollar (3rd), Péter Halász, Anna Koós, Stephan Balint and Eva Buchmuller. Other members of Squat Theatre were: Eric Daillie, Agnes Santha, Klara Palotai, Eszter Balint, Boris Major, Rebecca Major, and Judith Galus Halasz. Important contributing actors were Sheryl Sutton, Sandi Fiddler, Kathleen Kendall, Nico, Yossi Gutmann (viola), Shirley Clarke, Richard Leacock, August Darnell, Mark Boone Junior, Sue Williams, Jane Smith, Larry Solomon, Ivan Jakovits and Jan Gontarczyk. Boris and Rebecca Major are the daughters of János Major. 

Originally, the company was known as Kassák Haz Studió and was located at Uzsoki-utca 57, Budapest. For political and aesthetic reasons, the company emigrated to Paris and then to the United States. In 1969 Anna Koós, Péter Halász and Stephan Balint from the University Theatre of Budapest created an independent theatre group called Kassák Haz Studió.
In 1972 they were censored by the Hungarian authorities for "political and esthetic radicalism", and banned from performing in public. In the next four years they wrote 36 performance events: plays, sketches and improvisations. These were shown in apartments, staircases, streets, beaches, and in the countryside. "Manifesto" by István Bálint (Stephan Balint) on behalf of Studio Kassak was published in Schmuck, Hungary, March–April, 1973 issue.

Audiences
The building at 256 West 23rd Street had a large window on the sidewalk with a street entrance this provided the possibility of having two audiences, one inside and one outside. The spectators sat in the back of the space facing the storefront window and 23rd street beyond. Events took place with the street as a backdrop, with the intention of unsettling the events, the relationship among the members of the theatre group, and the audience. This set-up was first used in Rotterdam at 129a Van Oldenbarneveltstraat in the show Pig, Child, Fire!, which was commissioned by the Toneelraad Rotterdam.
On 23rd Street they lived, worked and performed from 1977 to 1985.

1973 to 1985
Various plays were performed in 1973 including Alice and Her Sisters,  Tribute to Miron Bialoszewski performed at the Polish Cultural Center in Budapest. Birds and Red Epaulets, Éva Buchmüller sings a Jewish song as the Virgin Mary holding Can Togay on her lap in the position of Michelangelo's Pieta.

The Three Sisters by Anton Chekhov was performed for the first time at Dohány utca 20, Budapest. They used as text the abridged version of the original play limited to the lines of the three sisters. The company left Hungary for the West.

Andy Warhol's Last Love was collectively created,opened on 23rd Street in 1978. The Company went on tour to Hamburg, Rome. Milan, Florence, Belgrade, Rotterdam and Brussels. It won a Grand Prix at the Belgrade International Theatre Festival (BITEF), and the Italian Critics’ Award for the Best Foreign Performance.<ref name="Koós. 2015, p.2">Koós. '"Squat Theatre: Staging Life/Living on Stage. A Journal of Performance and Art, 2015, p.2.</ref>

In 1981 Mr Dead & Mrs Free premiered in Cologne, Germany. Commissioned by Ivan Nagel director of Theater der Welt and shown at Cologne’s "Theatres of the World" festival, Mr. Dead & Mrs. Free was filmed by Rainer Werner Fassbinder as part of his first and only documentary Theater in Trance. It was also shown in New York City and Amsterdam.  The show had a year-and-a-half performance run on 23rd Street. It was awarded an Obie Award (1982) for the Best New American Play. It received a The Villager (Manhattan) Award. An open-air version of the show, The Battle of Sirolo was performed in August in Polverigi, Italy. In the summer of 1985 the theatre lost the eight-year lease of their home and performance space on 23rd Street.

Plays
 1975–79 – Three Sisters by Anton Chekhov Three men dressed in white are the Sisters, sitting in a group, sipping vodka as a prompter reads their lines, the actors repeat the words.Eva Buchmuller_Buchmuller, Koós. Squat Theatre. Artist Space, 1996, p.40-41.
 1977 – Pig, Child, Fire!, a play in five parts. The first, a drama based on the confessions of Nikolai Stavrogin in Fyodor Dostoevsky's Demons. The second is inspired by 1940s American Gangster films. The third is a comic act.
 1978 – Andy Warhol's Last Love.Ulrike Meinhof meets Andy Warhol in 3 acts: Aliens on the Second Floor, An Imperial Message  and Interview With the Dead.Shank, Adele Edling, and Theodore Shank. "Squat Theatre’s ‘Andy Warhol’s Last Love.’" The Drama Review: TDR, vol. 22, no. 3, The MIT Press, 1978, pp. 11–22, https://doi.org/10.2307/1145183.
 1981 – Mr. Dead & Mrs. Free, 1981.Körösi, Suzanne. "Squat Theatre’s ‘Mr. Dead and Mrs. Free.’" The Drama Review: TDR, vol. 25, no. 4, The MIT Press, 1981, pp. 75–81, https://doi.org/10.2307/1145380.
 1981 – The Battle of Sirolo. Open-air version of Mr. Dead & Mrs. Free. Premiere at Polverigi Festival (Inteatro Festival, Polverigi.)
 1982 – The Golden Age of Squat Theatre. A retrospective of three Squat Theatre plays Pig, Child, Fire!, Andy Warhol's Last Love, and Mr. Dead & Mrs. Free.
 1985–86 – Dreamland Burns.   
 1985–86 – L-Train to Eldorado. 
 1990–91 – Full Moon Killer. 

Filmography
 Minotaur in a Sand Mine (1975), 20 minutes, B&W, 16mm, Budapest, Biennale de Paris.
 Don Juan von Leporello (1975), 60 minutes, B&W, 16mm, Budapest, Düsseldorf.
 Andy Warhol's Last Love, (1978), An Imperial Message, 2nd part of play. 1978–81, 60 min, b&w and color, sound, 16mm.
 Mr. Dead & Mrs. Free. (1981), 43 minutes, color, 16mm. Part of the play Mr. Dead & Mrs. Free exhibited separately, Hamburg, Abaton Cinema, Berlin. Künstlerhaus; Yale University. Directed by Stephan Balint and Péter Halász. Péter Halász, cinematography.
 A Matter of Facts (1982) by Eric Mitchell w/ Squat Theatre (Archival).  17 minutes, 45 seconds, color, 16mm.
 Tscherwonez. (1983), Directed by Gabor Altorjay. With Stephan Balint,Peter (Breznyik) Berg, Péter Halász and Eva Buchmuller.
 Let Me Love You, (1985), 36 minutes, B&W, 16mm. Directed by Stephan Balint. Part of the play Dreamland Burns. Exhibited at Montreal, International Festival of New Cinema & Video. (Festival du nouveau cinéma). With Shirley Clarke, Richard Leacock and August Darnell.

Videos

 1981  Pig, Child, Fire! 60 min, color, sound.

 1982Mr Dead & Mrs Free 10 minutes, color 3/4". 
 1982Andy Warhol's Last Love 53 minutes, color 3/4".
 1982Mr Dead & Mrs Free 60 minutes, color 3/4". Presented in Berlin, Yale University.
 1986L-Train to Eldorado 60 minutes, color 3/4".
 1989L-Train To Eldorado 90 minutes, color 3/4".
 1989Major Productions 60 minutes, color 3/4".
 1991Full Moon Killer 45 minutes, color 3/4".

Exhibits
 1982 – Mr Dead & Mrs Free's Cafe, MoMA PS1, Long Island City. Exhibition by Eva Buchmuller and Stephan Balint.Buchmuller, Koós. Squat Theatre. Artist Space, 1996, p.220.
 1982 – The Moments Before The Tragedy, The Kitchen, New York City. Exhibition by Eva Buchmuller and Stephan Balint.
 1984 – Suspense, Hallwalls, Buffalo, New York. Exhibition by Eva Buchmuller and Stephan Balint.
 1984 – A Painted Show, Postmasters Gallery, New York City. Exhibition by Eva Buchmuller and Stephan Balint.
 1996 – Mr. Dead & Mrs. Free: A History of Squat Theatre (1969 – 1991), Artists Space, New York City. Exhibition by Eva Buchmuller.
 2004 – An Exhibition of Photography by Endre Kovacs, Kassák House Studio – Squat Theatre: Photos of the History of the Hungarian Underground Theatre. September 9 to October 10, 2004. Ludwig Museum Budapest. Curated by Dr. Vera Baksa-Soos.
 2013–14 – Rituals of Rented Island, Whitney Museum, New York City. Exhibition by Eva Buchmuller with Osvaldo Valdes, Architect. 

Awards

 1978 – OBIE Award,' for outstanding achievement for Pig, Child, Fire 1978 – OBIE Award to Eva Buchmuller,Sustained Excellence of Stage Design
 1979 – Grand Prix, Belgrade International Theatre Festival, Belgrade
 1979 – Best Foreign Theatre Performance of the Year', Italian Critics Award for Andy Warhol's Last Love 1982 – OBIE Award, Best American Play, Mr. Dead & Mrs. Free 1985 – Star of the Week by Hamburger Abendblatt for Dreamland Burns 1986 – Bessie Awards to Eva Buchmuller/Squat Theatre for visuals of Dreamland Burns.
 1988 – American Theatre Wing Award to Eva Buchmuller. Award for Noteworthy/unusual effects for scenic design of Dreamland Burns 
 1986 – American Theatre Wing Award to Eva Buchmuller for art and stage design of L Train To El Dorado 
 1988 – OBIE Award to Eva Buchmuller for sustained excellence in set design for Squat Theatre.
 1989 – New York Foundation for the Arts Fellowship to Stephan Balint and set designer Eva Buchmuller

Gallery

See also

Three Sisters (play)
Experimental theatre
Stephan Balint
Eszter Balint
Péter Halász (actor)
Ulrike Meinhof

 Notes 

References

Bibliography

 
 

Further reading
 Arnold Aronson: American Avant-Garde Theatre: A History (Theatre Production Studies). Routledge, 2000, 
 Günter Berghaus: Theatre, Performance and the Historical Avant-Garde. Palgrave Macmillan US, 2005, 
 Squiers, Anthony. An Introduction to the Social and Political Philosophy of Bertolt Brecht: Revolution and Aesthetics. 2014. * 
 Gussow, Mel:Evoking Bohemian Memories The New York Times, January 20, 1989
 La Rocco, Claudia: You Don’t Know Squat ARTFORUM, November 13, 2013
 The Quirky Invincibility of Mr. Dead and Mrs. Free HYPERALLERGIC
 Squat Brings Its Fiery Theater Style To Chicago In `Dreamland Burns` Chicago Tribune, May 15, 1986.
 Squat Theatre--hungarians Take A Stance On America LA Times
 Shewey, Don SQUAT THEATER and The Art of Living 
 Rodrigo Toscano and Natalie Knight:Squat Theatre and Crisis Jacket 40
 Squat Theater: Dreamland Burns The Kitchen, NYC
 Revolutionizing Theater Mtrack 83
 Plays and Players Cregan, David. Introduces a Surprising Troupe. June, 1977.
 MOTIVES Eva Buchmuller, Installation at Hallwalls, Buffalo, New York
 Squat Theatre Shank, Theodore. Performing Arts Journal Vol. 3, No. 2 (Autumn, 1978), pp. 61–69
 NEW OBSERVATIONS Guest Editors Eva Buchmuller and Stephan Balint.
 Legawiec, Stephen "Between Fiction and Reality: Squat Theatre"

Archives
 University of California, Davis Special Collections Ms. Daryl Morrison, Head, Special Collections / dmorrison@ucdavis.edu / 530 752 2112, videos, documents, set pieces.
 Országos Színháztörténeti Intezet manuscripts, videos. address: 1013, Budapest Krisztina körút 57. phone number: (1) 375-1184 e-mail: oszmi@szinhaziintezet.hu1013.
 National Theatre History Museum and Institute. manuscripts, videos. address: 1013, Budapest Krisztina körút 57. phone number: (1) 375-1184 e-mail: oszmi@szinhaziintezet.hu1013.
 Library for the Performing Arts at Lincoln Center  video archive collection
 EAI Electronic Arts Intermix Video collection''
  Andy Warhol's Last Love 1978–81, 60 min, b&w and color, sound. EAI Electronic Arts Intermix, 13 July 2018 (UTC)
 Mr. Dead & Mrs. Free 1982, 83 min, b&w and color, sound. EAI Electronic Arts Intermix, 13 July 2018 (UTC)
 Pig, Child, Fire! 1981, 60 min, color, sound. EAI Electronic Arts Intermix, 13 July 2018 (UTC).

External links
 PLAYS BY SQUAT THEATRE Artpool, Hungary.
 Squat Theatre Official Website
 The Segal Center, NYC, Legacy of Squat Theatre, 12/2/2013
 National Health - Dreams Wide Awake (Squat Theatre, NY 1979-11-30 Late Show)
 Friends of Squat Select Films, Videos, Readers and Performers
 A Matter of Facts 1982 by Eric Mitchell w/ Squat Theatre (Archival)

 

Theatre companies
Defunct Theatre companies in New York City
Obie Award recipients
 
 
1977 establishments in New York City